William Charles Sadlier (29 May 1867 – 1 February 1935) was the 4th Anglican bishop of Nelson whose Episcopate spanned a 22-year period    in the first half of the  20th century.

He was educated at Trinity College, Melbourne and ordained in 1892. After a curacy at St Paul's, Bendigo he  was Vicar of Holy Trinity, Melbourne. From 1904 to 1912 he was Vicar of Christ Church, St Kilda  when he was elevated to the episcopate.

Notes

1867 births
People from County Cork
University of Melbourne alumni
People educated at Trinity College (University of Melbourne)
Anglican bishops of Nelson
20th-century Anglican bishops in New Zealand
Holders of a Lambeth degree
1935 deaths